Aloysius Anagonye (born February 10, 1981) is a Nigerian-American professional basketball player for ALM Évreux Basket of the LNB Pro B.

Professional career
Anagonye played for Italian Serie A sides Villaggio Solidago Livorno (2004–2005) and Premiata Montegranaro (2006–2007). 
In 2012, Anagonye signed with Ford Burgos of LEB Oro league, with whom he had played during the 2009–10 season, but he was prevented from playing for the Spaniards due to a FIBA ban on the team's registration of new player.

International career
Although he was born in the United States, Anagonye played internationally with the Nigeria national basketball team at the 2006 FIBA World Championship and the FIBA Africa Championship 2007, where Nigeria finished in 5th place.

References

External links
Euroleague player profile
Serie A profile  Retrieved 11 August 2015
LNB Pro A profile
Aloysius Anagonye D League profile
ACB Profile @ acb.com

1981 births
Living people
2006 FIBA World Championship players
ALM Évreux Basket players
American expatriate basketball people in France
American expatriate basketball people in Israel
American expatriate basketball people in Italy
American expatriate basketball people in Spain
American expatriate basketball people in Turkey
American men's basketball players
American sportspeople of Nigerian descent
Basket Livorno players
Basketball players from Michigan
CB Valladolid players
Centers (basketball)
Hapoel Gilboa Galil Elyon players
Ilysiakos B.C. players
Joventut Badalona players
KK Olimpija players
Lega Basket Serie A players
Liga ACB players
Los Angeles D-Fenders players
Michigan State Spartans men's basketball players
Nigerian expatriate basketball people in France
Nigerian expatriate basketball people in Israel
Nigerian expatriate basketball people in Italy
Nigerian expatriate basketball people in Spain
Nigerian men's basketball players
Orléans Loiret Basket players
Metropolitans 92 players
Pertevniyal S.K. players
Power forwards (basketball)
Saint Martin de Porres High School (Detroit) alumni
SOMB Boulogne-sur-Mer players
Sutor Basket Montegranaro players
Sportspeople from Southfield, Michigan